Martindale is a small unincorporated community located in Earl Township in Lancaster County, Pennsylvania.

The center of Martindale is located at the intersection of Martindale Road and Gristmill Road. Eby's General Store currently sits at this intersection.

Unincorporated communities in Lancaster County, Pennsylvania
Unincorporated communities in Pennsylvania